Armadilloniscus ellipticus is a species of woodlouse in the family Detonidae. It is found in North America, Oceania, Europe, temperate Asia, Africa, and the Caribbean.

Subspecies
These two subspecies belong to the species Armadilloniscus ellipticus:
 Armadilloniscus littoralis littoralis
 Armadilloniscus littoralis madeirae Arcangeli, 1957

References

Isopoda
Articles created by Qbugbot
Crustaceans described in 1878